The 1997 Champion Hurdle was a horse race held at Cheltenham Racecourse on Tuesday 11 March 1997. It was the 68th running of the Champion Hurdle.

The winner was Peter Deal's Make A Stand, a six-year-old chestnut gelding trained in Devon by Martin Pipe and ridden by A. P. McCoy. Make A Stand's victory was a first in the race for both jockey and owner: Pipe had previously won the race with Granville Again in 1993.

Make A Stand, formerly a moderate flat racer, but the winner of his last four hurdle races, started the 7/1 fourth choice in the betting and won by five lengths and three quarters of a length from the Irish challengers Theatreworld and Space Trucker. The only previous champion in the field was the 1996 winner Collier Bay who jumped poorly and was pulled up three hurdles from the finish. The 7/2 favourite Large Action who had finished third in 1994 and second in 1995 was pulled up after two hurdles. Fifteen of the seventeen runners completed the course.

Race details
 Sponsor: Smurfit
 Purse: £208,900; First prize: £124,138
 Going: Good
 Distance: 2 miles 110 yards
 Number of runners: 17
 Winner's time: 3m 48.40

Full result

 Abbreviations: nse = nose; nk = neck; hd = head; dist = distance; UR = unseated rider; PU = pulled up; LFT = left at start; SU = slipped up; BD = brought down

Winner's details
Further details of the winner, Make A Stand
 Sex: Gelding
 Foaled: 21 March 1991
 Country: United Kingdom
 Sire: Master Willie; Dam: Make A Signal (Royal Gunner)
 Owner: Peter Deal
 Breeder: R. M. West

References

Champion Hurdle
 1997
Champion Hurdle
Champion Hurdle
1990s in Gloucestershire